The Robert and Margrit Mondavi Center for the Performing Arts is a performing arts venue located on the UC Davis campus in unincorporated Yolo County, California. It is named for arts patron and vineyard operator Robert Mondavi, who donated US$10 million to help with the building costs, and who also helped finance The Robert Mondavi Institute for Wine and Food Science on the same campus. The current annual operating budget is approximately US$7.3 million, 58% of which comes from earned income.

Mondavi Center opened on October 3, 2002, for the UC Davis Symphony Orchestra and today serves as a venue for musical concerts, theater, dance, lecturers and other entertainers. The façade is a large glass-panelled lobby that is surrounded by sandstone that also lines the interior walls.

Performance and other facilities
The facilities include:
Jackson Hall, named after university professor William Jackson, whose wife Barbara Jackson donated $5 million to the project in memory of him. It seats 1,801.
Vanderhoef Studio Theatre, named after former university Chancellor Larry N. Vanderhoef. It seats 250.

Architecture and design
The facility was designed by Boora Architects of Portland, Oregon as a box within a box in order to insulate the hall from the sound of the nearby freeway and train tracks.  The center also features moveable panels that can adjust the acoustics of the main hall and an orchestra shell on air casters.

Many green construction techniques were used to further the university's commitment to the environment and sustainable construction methods.

The Mondavi Center features a M'elodie Meyer Sound system for sound reinforcement.

References

External links
 Mondavi Center official website
 Mondavi Center on the Davis Wiki
 Article about the Center
 The Robert Mondavi Institute for Wine and Food Science
 Boora Architects website

University of California, Davis campus
2002 establishments in California
Event venues established in 2002
Performing arts centers in California
Theatre in California
University and college arts centers in the United States
Tourist attractions in Yolo County, California